Oldřich Lajsek (Czech pronunciation: lai•sek) (8 February 1925 – 2 October 2001) was a Czech painter, designer, graphic artist and teacher of arts. He became a member of the Union of Czechoslovak Creative Artists in 1954. He was the head of an artistic society named The Group of Eight Artists. In 1985, he was awarded the national honor For Excellent Work. During his life, he created over 3000 productions of which more than 1800 went to private collections.

Life
Lajsek was born on 8 February 1925 in Křesetice, a village near Kutná Hora in the central Bohemia (Czechoslovakia) in a merchant family. In 1944, he graduated from a machinery industrial high school in Kutná Hora. During World War II, he took part in a rebellious organization "The Fist", where he fought against the Nazi occupation of Czechoslovakia. After World War II, he moved to Prague, Czechoslovakia, where he worked in the Czechoslovak Union of Industry. Beginning in 1946, he studied at the Charles University in Prague. During this time, Lajsek discovered his artistic talent, and he graduated in 1950. In 1966 he also graduated with degree in economy. Then he worked as a teacher. He was also a professor at the School of Applied Arts in Prague beginning in 1955.

Lajsek achieved success in his artistic career quite early. In 1955, he was accepted into the Štursa society, and later to the VI Center. He took part in a competition for renovation of premises of the National Theatre (Prague). Since 1954, he had been a member of the Union of Czechoslovak Creative Artists. In 1960, he established an artistic society named "The Group of Eight Artists", in which he acted as the head. The aims of this society were mainly to set up educational, artistic events in the countryside and to look for new places where various exhibitions might be held. In 1985, he was awarded by the president of republic with the national honor For Excellent Work. He died on 2 October 2001 in Prague, Czech Republic, at the age of 76.

Painting
His artistic production was very versatile in genres. He was dedicated to abstract painting, realism, surrealism, etc. But his best known production was landscape painting. In this respect, he was one of the best-known painters of his period in Czechoslovakia. He inspired himself in his home Central Bohemian Region or in streets of Prague, as well as during his abroad journeys to Greece or Yugoslavia.

Famous works

Landscape paintings
 Hořící Lidice (Burning Village of Lidice), 1974;
 Ze Stanice metra (From the Underground Station), 1982;
 Akropolis (Acropolis), 1983;
 Červená krajina (A Red Landscape), 1985;
 Jaro, Léto, Podzim, Zima (The Spring, The Summer, The Autumn, The Winter) (set of paintings), 1985.

Abstract paintings
 Bílá (A White Colour), 1957;
 Zrcadlo (The Mirror), 1962;
 Modrá (A Blue Colour), 1963.

Realism
 Ráno v Praze (A Morning in Prague), 1983;
 Slunečnice (Sunflowers), 1971.

Surrealism
 Smutek (The Sorrow), 1959.

Literature
 Boučková, J.: Nové tendence v tvorbě mladých českých výtvarníků. Pardubice: Východočeská galerie v Pardubicích, 1968.
 Boučková, J.: Soudobá česká krajina. Pardubice: Východočeská galerie v Pardubicích, 1968.
 Hlaváček, J.: 8 výtvarníků. Galerie ČFVU – Purkyně. Praha: Český fond výtvarných umění, 1960, F 151350.
 Vinter, V.: Krajiny Oldřicha Lajska. Květy, 5. 2. 1987, str. 46-47.
 Vinter, V.: Oldřich Lajsek. Praha: Svaz českých výtvarných umělců, 1986.
 Štorkán, K.: Oldřich Lajsek – obrazy. Praha: Podnik českého fondu výtvarných umění, 1981.

External links
 Bibliothek des Kunstgewerbemuseums: http://katalog.upm.cz/cgi-bin/k6?ST=03&L=03&KOD=02&PZ=02&KDE=016&JAK=L&ADR=0019059646
 Online catalogue of paintings of Oldřich Lajsek: https://web.archive.org/web/20140714110514/http://www.phsoft.cz/lajsek.html
 Galerie výtvarného umění v Ostravě: http://gvuostrava.knihovny.net/katalog/l.dll?cll~9110
 Signatueres of painters: http://www.signaturymaliru.cz/painter/601.php
 Východočeská galerie v Pardubicích: http://www.vcg.cz/databaze.html?kat=1&autor=L&PHPSES...

Czech artists
1925 births
2001 deaths
Czechoslovak artists
Charles University alumni